Ignacio Álvarez Pérez (born 11 April 1957) is a Mexican swimmer who competed in the 1976 Summer Olympics.

References

1957 births
Living people
Mexican male swimmers
Male backstroke swimmers
Olympic swimmers of Mexico
Swimmers at the 1976 Summer Olympics
Central American and Caribbean Games gold medalists for Mexico
Competitors at the 1974 Central American and Caribbean Games
Central American and Caribbean Games medalists in swimming